The Waco Kickers were a soccer club owned by Dr. Albert F. Mikulencak based in Waco, Texas that competed in the SISL. Following the 1990 outdoor season, the merged into North Texas United.

Year-by-year

Defunct soccer clubs in Texas
USISL teams
Defunct indoor soccer clubs in the United States
DFW Tornados
1990 disestablishments in Texas
1989 establishments in Texas
Association football clubs established in 1989
Association football clubs disestablished in 1990